Adrien Hunou (born 19 January 1994) is a French professional footballer who plays as an attacking midfielder and forward for  club Angers. He has represented France at youth level, having played for the under-18, under-19, and under-20 teams.

Club career

Rennes 
Hunou made his Ligue 1 debut at 25 August 2013 against Evian, replacing Nélson Oliveira after 87 minutes. He was loaned to Ligue 2 side Clermont in December 2014.

On 21 September 2016, Hunou made his first appearance of the 2016–17 season in Ligue 1 and scored his first goal for Rennes, contributing the late winner in a 3–2 defeat of Marseille.

Minnesota United 
On 23 April 2021, Hunou signed with Major League Soccer club Minnesota United.

Angers 
On 29 June 2022, Hunou returned to France, signing for Ligue 1 side Angers on a three-year contract.

International career
Born in France, Hunou is of Polish descent through a grandmother. Hunou has represented France's U18, U19 and U20 international youth teams.

In February 2021, Hunou expressed a desire to play for the Poland national team.

Honours
Rennes
Coupe de France: 2018–19; runner-up: 2013–14

France U19
UEFA European Under-19 Championship runner-up: 2013
France U20

 Toulon Tournament: 2015

References

External links

 

Eurosport profile

1994 births
Living people
People from Évry, Essonne
Footballers from Essonne
French footballers
France youth international footballers
French people of Polish descent
Association football midfielders
US Sénart-Moissy players
US Torcy players
INF Clairefontaine players
Stade Rennais F.C. players
Clermont Foot players
Minnesota United FC players
Angers SCO players
Championnat National 3 players
Ligue 1 players
Ligue 2 players
Championnat National 2 players
Major League Soccer players
French expatriate footballers
Expatriate soccer players in the United States
French expatriate sportspeople in the United States
Designated Players (MLS)